The Cadillac V-16 (also known as the Cadillac Sixteen) was Cadillac's top-of-the-line model from its January 1930 launch until 1940. The V16 powered car was a first in the United States, both extremely expensive and exclusive, with every chassis being custom-finished to order.  Only 4,076 were constructed in its 11-year run, with the majority built in its debut year before the Great Depression took strong hold. The onset of World War II reduced the sales, resulting in its demise.

Genesis 
In 1926, Cadillac began the development of a new, "multi-cylinder" car. A customer requirement was seen for a car powered by an engine simultaneously more powerful and smoother than any other available. Development proceeded in great secrecy over the next few years; a number of prototype cars were built and tested as the new engine was developed, while at the same time Cadillac chief Larry Fisher and GM's stylist Harley Earl toured Europe in search of inspiration from Europe's finest coachbuilders. Unlike many builders of luxury cars, who sold bare chassis to be clothed by outside coachbuilding firms, General Motors had purchased the coachbuilders Fleetwood Metal Body and Fisher Body to keep all the business in-house. Cadillac rolling stock chassis could be purchased if a buyer insisted, but the intention was that few would need to do so. One Cadillac dealer in England, namely Lendrum & Hartman, ordered at least two such chassis in even rarer right hand drive (RHD) configuration and had Vanden Plas (Belgium) build first an elegant limousine-landaulet (engine #702297), then a sports sedan with unusual cycle fenders and retractable step plates in lieu of running boards (engine #702298, which was successfully shown in various Concours d'Elegance events in Europe before being bought by the young Nawab of Bahawalpur); both these cars have survived. A third RHD chassis was ordered by the Indian Maharaja of Orchha (Bhopal) and sent to Farina in Italy, in July 1931, for a boat tail body (engine between #703136 and #703152).

It was not until after the Wall Street Crash of 1929 and the Great Depression that Cadillac announced to the world the availability of the costliest Cadillac yet, the new V-16 Series 452. The new vehicle was first displayed at New York City's automobile show on January 4, 1930. Despite the bad timing and high retail price, and although sales would later drop off considerably, the launch "exceeded Cadillac’s fondest aspirations."

1930–1937 

The Cadillac V-16 was distinguished by its pioneering V-16 engine, a narrow 45° V angle OHV Series 452 displacing .

Upon its introduction the new car attracted rave reviews from the press and huge public attention. January production averaged a couple of cars per day, then ramped up to twenty-two. By April, 1,000 units had been built, and by June, 2,000 cars. These could be ordered with a wide variety of bodywork. The Fleetwood catalog for the 1930 V-16 included 10 basic body styles; there was also an envelope containing some 30 additional designer's drawings. Research by the Cadillac-La Salle Club, Inc. puts at 70 the number of different job/style numbers built by Fisher and Fleetwood on the Sixteen chassis.

Beginning in June 1930, five new V-16s participated in a promotional tour of major European cities including Paris, Antwerp, Brussels, Amsterdam, Utrecht, Copenhagen, Stockholm, Berlin, Cologne, Dresden, Frankfurt, Hamburg, Munich, Nuremberg, Vienna (where they won prizes), Berne, Geneva, Lausanne, Zürich, Madrid, San Sebastian, La Baule and Angers. On the return journey from Spain, the V16 caravan stopped also in the town of Cadillac, in south-western France, although that city bears no relationship to the marque, other than its name.

After the peak in V-16 orders in mid-1930, production fell precipitously. During October 1930, only 54 cars were built. The lowest figures for the 452/452A cars of 1930–31 were August 1931 (seven units) and November 1931 (six units). Minimum production continued throughout the rest of the decade with a mere 50 units being built both in 1935 and in 1937. 1940 was only marginally better with a total of 51 units. Not surprisingly, Cadillac later estimated that they lost money on every single V-16 they sold. The 1930 Town Brougham was listed at US$9,200 ($ in  dollars ).

Production of the original V-16 continued under various model names through 1937. The body was redesigned in 1933 as the model 452C. Innovations included Fisher no draft individually controlled ventilation (I.C.V. or vent windows).

For 1934, the body was redesigned again and denoted as 452D, and as 452E in 1935. The V-16 now featured the Fisher Turret Top all-steel roof, though the cars were still built by Fleetwood. This same basic design would remain virtually unchanged through 1937. Combined production for the 1934 and 1935 model years was 150. It was redesignated the Series 90 in 1936 as Cadillac reorganized their model names. Fifty-two units were sold that year, with nearly half ordered as limousines. Hydraulic brakes were added for 1937, the last year of production. Fifty vehicles were produced.

1937 Cadillac V16 Hartman Cabriolet
In 1937 Cadillac built fifty of their most expensive Series 90 V-16 chassis, and all but two were bodied in-house by Fleetwood. This chassis was delivered to Lausanne, Switzerland, to be bodied by Carrosserie Willy Hartmann per an order by local resident Philippe Barraud, a wealthy paper mill heir and playboy of the 1930s. Barraud wanted an outrageous, bespoke automobile to suit his stylish lifestyle. Stretching 22 feet in length, the car was designed in the sweeping cabriolet style of the Delahaye built by Figoni & Falaschi for the 1936 Paris Auto Salon.

Production / Sales 
1930 2,500
1931 750
1932 300
1935 to 1937: 49 each year

1938–1940 

The V-16 "Series 90" and V-12 "Series 80 and 85", were essentially merged for 1938 with the introduction of the new L-head V-16. The  engine was an in-block valve (i.e. flathead) design, and featured a wider 135° V-angle, twin carburetors, twin fuel pumps, twin distributors, twin water pumps, and a nine main bearing crankshaft (compared to the OHV V-16's five bearing crank) and produced the same  as later versions of the original V-16. This engine was nearly silent at idle and exceptionally smooth in operation. The "Sixteens" (as Cadillac referred to them) were basically series 75 cars with the new V-16 engine although they differed from the firewall forward from the V-8 cars and had several other trim differences. The instrument panels were identical to and changed yearly with the V-8 cars from 1938 to 1940. Only the '38 Sixteens had a horn button which had "Sixteen" in art deco script; the '39 and '40 models, like the V-8, had the Cadillac crest on the button. 315 were sold in the first year, 138 in the next. The production of the 1940 models ended in December 1939. The most expensive model documented was the 1940 Series 90 Town Car by Fleetwood at US$7,175 ($ in  dollars ) using a  wheelbase.

Today 
The Cadillac V-16 is today recognized as one of the finest automobiles of the prewar era by many authorities. The Classic Car Club of America rates all V-16s as CCCA Full Classics, a rating reserved for only the finest automobiles of the 1925–1948 period.

Concept car

In 2003, Cadillac created a concept car called the Sixteen, which used a 13.6 litre V-16 engine that developed . Even though it used the current "A&S" (Art & Science) style of design that is Cadillac's stylistic hallmark, it shared many small details from the classic V-16. The Sixteen is also known to have the steering wheel logo carved out of solid crystal and a Bulgari clock.

See also
 Opel Regent

References

Notes

Bibliography

External links
 Yann Saunders and the Cadillac-LaSalle Club, Inc. (1996–2004). The (new) Cadillac Database©: The Cadillac V16. Retrieved May 23, 2004 from https://web.archive.org/web/20140721110005/http://cadillacdatabase.org/Dbas_txt/V16_ndx.htm.
 "Sixteen-Cylinder Motor Latest Auto Wonder" Popular Mechanics, March 1930 article on first Cadillac V-16 engine
 1938 Cadillac V16 for sale from http://www.usedcarsgroup.com/used-1938-cadillac-v16-saint_louis-mo-388124984369755693

V-16
Motor vehicles manufactured in the United States
Rear-wheel-drive vehicles
Cars introduced in 1930